The Outsiders are a superhero team appearing in American comic books published by DC Comics. As their name suggests, the team consists of superheroes who do not fit the norms of the "mainstream" superhero community, i.e. the Justice League.

The Outsiders have had a number of different incarnations. They were founded by Batman, whose ties to the League had become strained at the time, and introduced the now-classic line-up of Batman, Black Lightning, Metamorpho, Geo-Force, Katana, Halo and Looker. A later incarnation of the Outsiders from the early 2000s comics was led by Nightwing and Arsenal following the dissolution of the Teen Titans superhero group, and depicted the team as a pro-active group hunting for supercriminals. For the team's third incarnation, Batman reforms the team as a special strike team featuring classic members Katana and Metamorpho alongside new recruits such as Catwoman and Black Lightning's daughter Thunder. After the Batman R.I.P. storyline, Alfred Pennyworth acts on Batman's instructions to reassemble the team once more, recruiting new members and more of the team's original lineup.

Another version of the team with a familiar line-up briefly featured in Batman Incorporated in 2011 as the black ops section of Batman's organization. Following DC's 2011 reboot, a new version of the Outsiders is introduced in the pages of Green Arrow as a secret society represented by seven weapon-themed clans. Members in this incarnation include Katana, Onyx, and several new characters. The original Outsiders are returned to continuity in 2017, following DC Rebirth, once again as a secret team founded by Batman; Batman revives the team with a new line-up in 2018. Black Lightning leads another incarnation in 2022.

A version of the team appears in the live action series Black Lightning, fully formed starting in the third season led by Black Lightning.

Fictional history

Batman and the Outsiders / The Adventures of the Outsiders (1983–1987)
The Outsiders first appeared in a special insert in the final issue (#200) of The Brave and the Bold in 1983. The team was given its own comic, Batman and the Outsiders, which debuted in August 1983. It was created and originally written by Mike W. Barr and illustrated by Jim Aparo (later illustrated by Alan Davis).

After Batman left the group in issue #32, the title was changed to The Adventures of the Outsiders, continuing until its cancellation with issue #46. Issue #38 featured the last original story in the series, as issues #39-46 were reprints of stories from the companion series The Outsiders (1985).

The cast of the Outsiders was notable for having mostly new characters (Geo-Force, Katana, Halo and Looker).  The other members were two characters who refused membership in the Justice League (Black Lightning and Metamorpho) and former Leaguer Batman.

Markovia and Baron Bedlam
The Outsiders formed in the fictional East European country of Markovia, which was ravaged by war at the time. Batman had attempted to enlist the Justice League of America's aid, but was told they had been ordered to stay out of the conflict. Because he disagreed with the order, Batman resigned to strike out on his own. He and Black Lightning traveled to Markovia to free captive Lucius Fox from Baron Bedlam (who killed the country's ruler, King Viktor). One of the king's sons became Geo-Force after gaining powers from Markovia's top scientist (Dr. Helga Jace) to stop Bedlam. Metamorpho was searching for Dr. Jace for the doctor to help him with his powers. Katana arrived in Markovia to kill General Karnz (Bedlam's military commander) as vengeance for her family's death. Batman found a young, amnesiac girl in the woods exhibiting light-based powers whom he names Halo who was an Aurakle that possessed the body of Violet Harper after she was killed by Syonide. These heroes banded together to defeat Baron Bedlam and decided to stay together as a team, later fighting such villains as Agent Orange, the Fearsome Five and the Cryonic Man.

The Masters of Disaster and the Force of July
Recurring foes include the Masters of Disaster (New Wave, Shakedown, Windfall, Heatstroke, and Coldsnap), who at one point were almost able to kill Black Lightning. Windfall eventually became disenchanted with her team and joined the Outsiders. Another recurring opponent was the Force of July, a group of patriotic metahumans who also regularly came into contact with the Suicide Squad. During this time, Geo-Force's half-sister Terra died as a traitor against the Teen Titans. Batman revealed his real identity as Bruce Wayne to the team (although they already knew it). Eventually, Halo's origins were revealed. Emily Briggs (who later became the superheroine Looker and joined the team) was introduced. Denise Howard (the love interest of Geo-Force) appeared for the second time.

Without Batman
Baron Bedlam later returned to life. With the assistance of the Bad Samaritan, the Masters of Disaster and Soviet forces, he again tried to seize control of Markovia. Batman withheld this information, angering the rest of the team. This eventually led to Batman disbanding the team and returning to the Justice League of America. Nevertheless, the team traveled to Markovia, discovering many Markovian military casualties. They were defeated by the Masters and learn that Bedlam cloned Adolf Hitler; however, the Hitler clone committed suicide in horror of the atrocities perpetrated by the original. The Outsiders became unofficial agents of Markovia to receive Markovian funding. They moved to Los Angeles; Geo-Force left his girlfriend Denise behind and Looker separated from her husband.

Outsiders (1985–1988)
This series again featured the original group, and was printed in the Baxter paper format used on such titles as The New Teen Titans (vol. 2) and the Legion of Super-Heroes (vol. 3). It lasted for 28 issues, in addition to Annuals and special issues. The series originally ran alongside the title The Adventures of the Outsiders, chronicling events a year after that series. In the end, the first few issues of this series were reprinted in The Adventures of the Outsiders before that title was cancelled.

Story
The team moves into a new headquarters in Los Angeles and once again becomes involved in an adventure with the Force of July (ending in Moscow). Villains such as the Duke of Oil and the Soviet super-team the People's Heroes are introduced during this time. The team's adventures take them all over the globe, most notably when the Outsiders' plane is shot down and the team is marooned on a deserted island for three weeks. Tensions rise as Geo-Force tries to resign his leadership and he and Looker succumb to temptation. Eventually, the team is rescued.

More trouble arises when a detective is hired to look into Looker (now working as a model known as Lia Briggs) and her private life, and learns of her actual identity as Emily. The detective tries to blackmail her, but she hypnotizes him and forces him to leave. However, he is killed shortly afterward and Looker is arrested as a suspect. The Outsiders, fortunately, clear her name.

Reunion with Batman
The Outsiders are reunited with Batman when they band together to fight Eclipso. After the adventure, Batman gives them access to a batcave in Los Angeles. The team is also infiltrated by a clone of Windfall. Meanwhile, Looker and Geo-Force feel guilty about their affair and eventually end it. Metamorpho faces his own personal problems with his wife, Sapphire Stagg-Mason. The clone of Windfall is ultimately killed; the Masters of Disaster are defeated, as the real Windfall joins the Outsiders. The team also meets the other Los Angeles-based team, Infinity, Inc.

Millennium

The team is next involved with the crossover event Millennium, wherein it is revealed that Dr. Jace is an operative of the villainous Manhunters and kidnaps the team. The team (now joined by the Atomic Knight) free themselves, but Dr. Jace blows up herself and Metamorpho. Looker is called to return to Abyssia (the origin of her powers), where she must also face the Manhunters. During the adventure, she is drained of much of her power and returns to her normal form. Halo is hit in the crossfire when saving Katana's life, and slips into a coma as Katana vows to look after her. The team is disbanded by Geo-Force as Looker returns to her husband, and Batman rejoins the Justice League.

Outsiders (vol. 2) (1993–1995)
This revival of the title in 1993 lasted 25 issues and was written by Mike W. Barr, with most issues penciled by Paul Pelletier.

Story
Declared a traitor in his native Markovia, Geo-Force is forced to seek the help of old (and new) Outsiders to battle the vampire-lord who controls his country. This is later coupled with the framing of the Outsiders for the slaughter of a Markovian village, forcing them into hiding. This fugitive status motivates the Atomic Knight to go after them, hoping to bring in his former allies without too much trouble. He is eventually convinced of their innocence and joins them.

The new members who join the team in Markovia are the magician Sebastian Faust, the warsuit-wearing engineer and industrialist the Technocrat and Wylde (Charlie Wylde), a friend of the Technocrat who has been turned into a mountain bear by Faust's uncontrollable magic.

During the initial confrontation with the vampires, Looker is (apparently) killed. Hiding out in Gotham City, the Outsiders experience another loss as the Technocrat's wife Marissa and Halo are killed during a fight with Batman (actually the man standing in for Bruce Wayne, Jean-Paul Valley). However, Halo's spirit survives in the reanimated body of Marissa. For some time afterward, the Technocrat has trouble accepting that his wife (whose body is still walking around) is dead. Eventually it is discovered that Looker is not dead, but undead. The Outsiders find her, and free her from the vampire's control.

Split in two
After the defeat of the vampires, two teams (one composed of Geo-Force, Katana, and the Technocrat; the other composed of the Eradicator, Looker, Wylde, Halo and Sebastian Faust) claim the name of the Outsiders; both teams are considered fugitives for some time, thanks to questionable tactics by their new members. During this time, the teams learn that Halo's (original) body has been brought back to life by the terrorist organization Kobra. In control of her body is Violet Harper, the evil woman whose body Halo originally inhabited. She now has abilities similar to Halo's, calls herself Spectra and joins Strike Force Kobra with Dervish and Windfall. Both Kobra and Violet Harper are defeated, and Windfall rejoins the Outsiders.

The two teams unite to confront Felix Faust, the father of Outsiders member Sebastian Faust. During the confrontation, the bear-like Wylde betrays the team when Felix promises to restore his humanity. The team defeats Felix Faust and Wylde, who eventually becomes an actual bear (without the ability to speak) and is kept in a zoo. The title ends with the clearing of the Outsiders' names and the marriage of Geo-Force and Denise Howard.

In the interim, the Halo entity is restored to Violet Harper's body, returning her to normal off-panel and a new team of Outsiders is formed and seen as active during the Day of Judgement crossover event. Members of this new team include Geo-Force, Halo, Katana, and Terra II, who in the 1999 Titans Secret Files series, left the team after a round of genetic tests performed by scientists failed to decipher Terra II's genetically altered DNA to tell who she was prior to being turned into a genetic doppelgänger of the original Terra.

Outsiders (vol. 3) (2003–2007)

Outsiders (vol. 3) is almost completely unrelated to the previous series.  It was launched in 2003 with new members, some of whom had been part of the Titans. The series was cancelled with issue #50 and relaunched as Batman and the Outsiders (vol. 2), featuring a mix of current and new members.

Formation
The new team is put together in the wake of the Titans/Young Justice: Graduation Day crossover, which dissolves both groups. Arsenal accepts a sponsorship offer from the Optitron Corporation and uses the money to buy an enormous bomb shelter which had belonged to a multimillionaire, renovating it as group headquarters. He recruits a group of young heroes, the last of whom is his friend Nightwing (who joins reluctantly). Nightwing decides that, instead of functioning in a reactive capacity like most other superhero teams, this group should act as hunters, tracking down supervillains before they can cause problems.

Infinite Crisis

Former Outsiders the Technocrat and Looker are near the Breach when he explodes in the Battle of Metropolis. The fate of the Technocrat remains unclear, while Looker soon appears in an issue of the World War III limited series. Roy Harper is saved by Superman from Doomsday, and Captain Marvel Jr. was sent to Earth-S when it was reformed. When New Earth came into existence, he went with other heroes who could fly to fight Superboy-Prime. In the Infinite Crisis hardcover, Freddy joined alongside the other Titans to take down the members of the Secret Society of Super Villains who tried to kill Robin.

One Year Later

After Infinite Crisis, the Outsiders are "officially" no more. Because of the Freedom of Power Treaty, the Outsiders have been operating covertly outside of the United States. Most of the members were presumed dead until a botched mission forced them to reveal their presence. Following the revelation of their existence, they are recruited by Checkmate to pursue missions which Checkmate cannot support publicly. Checkmate's assignment as part of the "CheckOut" crossover story arc involves dispatching the Outsiders to Oolong Island in China, the scene of World War III the previous year. The mission goes disastrously wrong when Chang Tzu captures Owen Mercer and Checkmate's Black Queen, until both sides are bailed out by Batman. In the aftermath, Nightwing decides to give Batman control of the team once more.

Batman and the Outsiders (vol. 2) / Outsiders (vol. 4) (2007–2011)

In November 2007, writer Chuck Dixon and artist Julian Lopez relaunched Outsiders (vol. 3) as Batman and the Outsiders (vol. 2), with the Dark Knight taking control of the team in the aftermath of the "CheckOut" crossover with Checkmate.

Outsiders: Five of a Kind
In the weeks leading up to the new series' debut, Batman holds tryouts to determine who will be on the team in a series of one-shots called Five of a Kind. Each issue featured a different creative team (including Outsiders creator Mike W. Barr) and an epilogue written by Tony Bedard.

Batman angers several members, who feel he has no right to remove people already on the team. Captain Boomerang leaves the team for Amanda Waller's Suicide Squad, and Nightwing decides to take no part in the Outsiders' questionable activities. Katana is chosen as the team's first official member, joined later by the Martian Manhunter, Metamorpho and Grace. Thunder is kicked off the team; the second Aquaman is rejected because Batman feels he does not match up to his predecessor, Orin. Batman then tells the other members: "Whether you like it or not, you're here to save the world. And you're going to be hated for it". After the team's first official mission (in Outsiders #50), Catwoman overheard the other recruits talking about the team being "down by law" and said: "Batman can't possibly start up his own crew of super-crooks without me in it!"

Batman and the Outsiders (vol. 2)
The team from Outsiders #50 was featured in the first two issues of Batman and the Outsiders (vol. 2). Afterward, Catwoman and the Martian Manhunter left the team and Batgirl, Geo-Force and the Green Arrow joined; Thunder consistently appeared in the series as well. In issue #5, Ralph "the Elongated Man" and Sue Dibny make a guest appearance. They are now "ghost detectives", and seem able to possess people in a method similar to that of Deadman. Dr. Francine Langstrom (wife of Dr. Kirk Langstrom, a.k.a. the Man-Bat) serves as the team's technical advisor, and her assistant Salah Miandad operates the "blank" OMAC drone known as ReMAC. In issue #9, Batman calls on former team member Looker to assist in an interrogation.

The first main storyline of the title involves Batman sending the team to investigate the mysterious Mr. Jardine, who is organizing a convoluted plot to populate a subterranean lake on the Moon with alien lifeforms. While trying to stop Jardine's unauthorized space-shot in South America, Metamorpho is blasted into space and is forced to escape from the International Space Station (where seemingly-brainwashed astronauts from around the world are building a giant weapon). Seeking a shuttle to hijack, the rest of the team infiltrates a Chinese space facility (only to be captured by members of the Great Ten). The timely intervention of Batgirl and ReMAC saves the team from execution. Metamorpho steals a shuttle back to Earth, escapes from the European Space Agency and rejoins the team.

During the Batman R.I.P. events, an assembly of the Outsiders (including Thunder) receives a message from the missing Batman. It asks them to feed a secret code into the cybernetic mind of ReMAC, allowing it to track the Caped Crusader and the Black Glove organization and help him in his fight. As they comply (against Batgirl's advice), the code reveals itself as a cybernetic booby-trap coming from Simon Hurt (the mastermind behind Batman's downfall) and ReMAC explodes. Several Outsiders are wounded, and Thunder suffers brain injuries severe enough to knock her into a seemingly-irreversible coma. However, her in-costume appearance in the Final Crisis: Submit story contradicts this; the events of that Final Crisis storyline occur after the events in Batman R.I.P., suggesting a continuity error. When Black Lightning rejoins the team after the events of Batman R.I.P. and Final Crisis, he is shown visiting Thunder (who is still hospitalized in a coma).

Outsiders (vol. 4)
As a result of Batman R.I.P. and Final Crisis (where Batman apparently died), the series was renamed Outsiders (vol. 4) and featured a new team roster. The change occurred when a new creative team took over, with Peter Tomasi writing and Lee Garbett on art duty. Tomasi began with Batman and the Outsiders Special (vol. 2) #1 and the retitled series began with issue #15.

One night, after going to visit the graves of Thomas and Martha Wayne, Alfred awakens in Wayne Manor to a giant door opening in his room. He walks through it, where he sees a pod with a chair inside. He takes a seat, as a hologram of Batman activates. Batman explains that, because he has not entered a special code into the Bat-Computer (or any of its subsidiaries) for a certain length of time, this recording is playing (meaning he is probably dead). He tells Alfred of a very important mission the latter must undertake on his behalf (since Batman is unable to do so), but gives him a choice to accept or decline. Alfred promptly accepts; Batman explains what Alfred has meant to him throughout his life, saying to him what he did not have a chance to say at his death: "Goodbye, Dad."

With this, Batman charges Alfred to assemble a new team of Outsiders. Alfred travels around the planet, recruiting Roy Raymond Jr., Black Lightning, Geo-Force (leader), Halo, Katana, the Creeper and Metamorpho. As a member of the team, each must become a true "outsider," living away from their families and the public eye for months at a time. Each member fills a role once filled by Batman, making this team a composite. This story arc ended with issue #25, and the series ended after 40 issues.

Post–Final Crisis
Dan DiDio and Phillip Tan began a new run of Outsiders in January 2010, in which Geo-Force appears to be acting more irrationally since his battle with Deathstroke. Without consulting the rest of the team (or Alfred), Geo-Force enters into a non-aggression pact with New Krypton (offering Markovia as a haven for all Kryptonians). The Eradicator is New Krypton's representative.

Batman Inc. (2011–2013)
In the 2011 Batman Inc. series by Grant Morrison, Batman assembles a new team of Outsiders which acts as a black-ops wing of Batman Incorporated. The team consists of Metamorpho, Katana, Looker, Halo and Freight Train, and is led by the Red Robin. This incarnation of the team proved short-lived, as all of its members (except the Red Robin) were caught in an explosion caused by Lord Death Man in the 2011 Batman Incorporated: Leviathan Strikes one-shot issue. The survivors were revealed in issue #1 of (vol. two) (2012). Metamorpho had kept everyone alive via his powers.

In Green Arrow (vol. 5) (2013–2016)
Beginning with Jeff Lemire's run of Green Arrow (vol. 5) in DC's The New 52 continuity, a new version of the 'Outsiders' was introduced. This is explained as being an ancient secret society dedicated to the elimination of corruption, but which itself has grown corrupt. Its membership is formed from the leaders of various clans centred around totemic weapons: the Mask, the Fist, the Arrow, the Axe, the Spear, the Shield, the Sword. A literal Green Arrow was the totemic weapon of the 'Arrow Clan', but this was destroyed by the Green Arrow as part of his symbolic rejection of the group. The Soultaker sword owned by Katana is the Sword Totem, making her the leader of the Sword Clan. The weapon totems supposedly grant immortality and enlightenment on the wielder, but the Green Arrow doubts such claims.

The leader of the Arrow Clan was once Robert Queen, the Green Arrow's father. With his apparent death, it passed to Komodo (Simon Lacroix), an evil archer. It would later be passed to Shado, Robert Queen's former lover and another master archer. Katana heads the Sword Clan. An unkillable shapeshifter named Magus heads the Mask Clan. A physically intimidating man known as the Butcher leads the Axe Clan. Golgotha, leader of the Spear Clan, for a time led the Outsiders overall. Onyx leads the Fist Clan. The Shield Clan is led by Kodiak, who in addition to his mastery of the shield, wears a terrifying skull mask.

DC Rebirth
The original Outsiders are reintroduced in Dark Days: The Forge #1 (2017), a prelude to DC's Dark Nights: Metal crossover, in an expository scene which explains that Batman formed the Outsiders (Black Lightning, Metamorpho, Geo-Force, Katana, and Halo) to investigate a mystery concerning the DC Universe which connects the strangeness of the Multiverse to the amazing properties of metals—like Nth metal, the Court of Owls' resurrection metal, Aquaman's trident, and Doctor Fate's helmet— to metahumans and to mystical lands like Nanda Parbat, Skartaris, Atlantis, and Themiscyra, and much more. He assembled the team to operate outside the knowledge of the government, the Justice League, or the Batman family.

In the Watchmen sequel Doomsday Clock, Geo-Force took advantage of the metahuman arms race in light of "the Superman Theory" and assembled Markovia's version of the Outsiders. The group consists of Baroness Bedlam, the Eradicator, Knightfall, Terra, and Wylde.

The Detective Comics story arc On the Outside (July 2018) had Batman and Black Lightning come together to defeat a villain known as Karma. In the aftermath of the battle, Batman told Black Lightning that he wanted him to lead a new team of Outsiders consisting of himself, Cassandra Cain, Duke Thomas, and Katana, who had fought as their allies in the fight against Karma. An ongoing comic book featuring this team, titled Batman and the Outsiders (vol. 3), was set to release in December 2018. The series was abruptly cancelled before finally releasing in May the following year.

Later, Black Lightning assembles a new "modular" iteration of the team with himself, Duke, Katana, and Metamorpho, plus a "rotating fifth chair" for other superheroes like Robin, Green Arrow, or Mister Miracle. In the set-up to the new series in Batman: Urban Legends, Batman formally asks to join the team as the fifth chair to help Duke track down the location of his mother.

Enemies

The following are enemies of the Outsiders:

 Bad Samaritan - A master technician.
 Baron Bedlam - A Markovian baron.
 Doctor Moon - A mad scientist.
 Duke of Oil - A cyborg who can control nearby nuclear devices.
 The Force of July - A group of patriotic metahumans that was established by the A.S.A.
 Major Victory - William Vickers is the team leader. He has enhanced strength, flight and energy blasts due to his government designed power suit. Killed by Eclipso.
 Abraham Lincoln Carlyle - Government liaison. Suffered a heart attack during a Suicide Squad attack.
 B. Eric Blairman - Government liaison for the A.S.A. who had the Psycho Pirate's Medusa Mask.
 Lady Liberty - Projects energy blasts from her torch and flight.  Killed in an explosion aboard Kobra's satellite during the climax of the Janus Directive.
 The Mayflower - Ability to control and grow plant life. Garotted by Ravan of the Suicide Squad.
 The Silent Majority - Power of self duplication. All of his duplicates were killed in battle aboard Kobra's satellite when he attempts to destroy a device that would kill billions.
 The Sparkler - Powers consisting of flight and the ability to project light as beams or even fireworks. Later slain by Doctor Light, who had severe mental problems concerning young superheroes.
 Ishmael - A former experiment of the Ark Project that became a member of the League of Assassins.
 Kobra - The leader of the Kobra organization.
 The Masters of Disaster - A group of elemental metahumans.
 The New Olympians - The New Olympians are Maxie Zeus' group of mercenaries selected to represent Greek and Roman gods to disrupt the 1984 Olympics.
 Antaeus I - Member of the New Olympians. He had powers similar to the actual Antaeus where he drew his strength from the ground. Antaeus was defeated in combat by Geo-Force.
 Argus - Member of the New Olympians. He can telepathically see events unfold from great distances. Argus is also a poor fighter since he was easily defeated by Batman. His abilities make him similar to the actual Argus Panoptes.
 Diana - Member of the New Olympians. She is a superb archer and swordswoman who also commands fierce dogs. Diana was defeated by Katana in a sword fight. Her talents make her similar to the actual Artemis.
 Nox - Member of the New Olympians. She controls a mysterious dark force that enables her to fly and can manipulate it to take on different shapes. Nox was defeated in a gymnastics match against Halo. Her abilities make her similar to the actual Nyx.
 Proteus - A shape-shifting member of the New Olympians. Besides shape-shifting, he can also elongate his limbs. Proteus first used his shape-shifting powers to make himself look handsome (since he disliked his previous appearance) and even grow bird-like wings. He and Vulcanus were defeated in a deadly soccer match against Black Lightning and Metamorpho. His abilities are similar to the actual Proteus.
 Vulcanus - Member of the New Olympians. He wields a powerful hammer and can hurl high-temperature fireballs. Vulcanus and Proteus were defeated in a deadly soccer match against Black Lightning and Metamorpho. His abilities are similar to the actual Hephaestus.
 The Nuclear Family - A group of androids whose appearances are modeled after their deceased creator and his deceased family.
 Strike Force Kobra - A group of villains whose powers are similar to some of Batman's enemies. They were created by Kobra.
 Syonide - A female assassin.
 Tobias Whale - An African American albino crime lord.
 Velocity - A clone of the Flash that was created by the Brotherhood of Evil and sold to a Malinese dictator named Ratu Bennin. While he possesses the Flash's speed, he does not possess his memories. Velocity was defeated by the Outsiders and taken into custody by Checkmate's White King Alan Scott.

Collected editions

Batman and the Outsiders (vol. 1)

Outsiders (vol. 3)

Batman and the Outsiders (vol. 2) / Outsiders (vol. 4)

Batman and the Outsiders (vol. 3)

Other versions
In the JLA: The Nail miniseries, the Outsiders were formed by Black Canary to help Oliver Queen have his own team to focus on after becoming paralyzed and losing an arm after a disastrous battle with Amazo, but who quickly dismissed them feeling like a "sidekick." The team consists of Black Canary, Black Lightning, Geo-Force, Katana, Metamorpho, and Shade, the Changing Man.

In the Batman: Earth One series of graphic novels, the Outsiders appear in volume 3 as an alliance of Gotham crimefighters brought together by Batman. The team consists of Batman, Robin, Batgirl, the Cat, Killer Croc, and Ragman, with Alfred Pennyworth and Lucas Fox supporting them in a subway version of the Batcave.

In other media

 The Outsiders appear in Batman: The Brave and the Bold, initially consisting of teenage versions of Black Lightning, Katana, and Metamorpho. Introduced in the episode "Enter the Outsiders!", the crime lord Slug brainwashes the trio into serving him. With Batman and Wildcat's help, the Outsiders break free of Slug's control, defeat him, and begin training under Wildcat's tutelage. As of the teaser for "Requiem for a Scarlet Speedster!", Geo-Force and Halo have joined the Outsiders as they work with Batman to stop Kobra and his cultists.
 A team loosely based on the Outsiders appears in the Beware the Batman episodes "Monsters" and "Alone", consisting of Batman, Katana, Metamorpho, Oracle, and Man-Bat. According to producer Glen Murakami, the planned second season would have added Cyborg and Red Arrow to the team while Oracle goes on to become Robin and Katana becomes Nightwing.
 Two variations of the Outsiders appear in Young Justice: Outsiders.
 The first version is a loose, unnamed group of outcasts and exiles formed from the aftermath of a mission to shut down a metahuman trafficking ring. Consisting of Halo, Geo-Force, Forager, and Cyborg, they are brought together by Nightwing, Black Lightning, Superboy, and Tigress, who train them to become members of the Team, and covertly work for the Justice League. Halo and Forager later join the Team, while Geo-Force goes on to join the Outsiders (see below).
 In the episode "First Impression", Beast Boy forms the Outsiders with Geo-Force, Wonder Girl, Blue Beetle, Kid Flash, and Static to serve as a public version of the Team and operate independently of the Justice League while secretly answering to them. In "Early Warning", El Dorado joins the team to inspire metahuman teenagers and children at the Meta-Human Youth Center to gain confidence in their abilities. In "Into the Breach", Cyborg joins them to help them find Halo after she is kidnapped by Granny Goodness. In "Nevermore", Markovian ambassador and Light member Zviad Baazovi secretly manipulates Geo-Force into killing his uncle, Baron Frederick DeLamb, and overthrowing his brother Gregor Markov as king of Markovia. As a result, the Outsiders oust him from the group and are joined by his sister Terra, Superboy, and Forager. The Outsiders later merge with the Justice League, Team, and Batman Inc. to form one group under Black Lightning's leadership. As of Young Justice: Phantoms, Robin, Windfall, Stargirl, Looker, and Livewire have joined the Outsiders while Cyborg transferred to the League.
 The Outsiders appear in the Black Lightning in two forms.
 In the season one episode "LaWanda: The Book of Burial", Grace Choi carries an Outsiders comic, which Anissa Pierce notices while conducting research in a bookstore.
 In the season three episode "The Book of Markovia: Chapter Four: Grab the Strap", Black Lightning, Anissa, Choi, Lightning, Brandon / Geo, Painkiller, TC, and A.S.A agents Gardner Grayle and Erica Moran form a team loosely based on the Outsiders to battle Markovian forces.

References

External links
 Cosmic Teams: Outsiders Index
 DCU Guide: Outsiders II 
 DCU Guide: Outsiders III 
 Outsiders at Don Markstein's Toonopedia. Archived from the original on September 7, 2015.

DC Comics titles
1983 comics debuts
DC Comics superhero teams
Batman characters